Dirk De Vriese (born 3 December 1958) is a Belgian footballer. He played in one match for the Belgium national football team in 1984.

References

1958 births
Living people
Belgian footballers
Belgium international footballers
Association football midfielders
People from Knokke-Heist
Footballers from West Flanders